Anne Quinane was the Australian High Commissioner to Kiribati from March 2006 until 2009 and High Commissioner to Malta from 2009 until 2012.  In both cases, she replaced Jurek Juszczyk.  In Malta, she was replaced by Jane Lambert.

References

Living people
Year of birth missing (living people)
High Commissioners of Australia to Kiribati
High Commissioners of Australia to Malta
Australian women ambassadors